Hanne Albert is a Danish physiotherapist with a Ph.D. in medical science. She works in the field of medical science, and her main research interest is in low back pain and pelvic girdle pain. Albert's studies have revealed that the painful condition bone œdema (Modic changes) could be caused by a bacterial infection and treated with antibiotics.

Career and education
Albert was authorized as a physiotherapist by Metropolitan University College in Copenhagen. In 2000, she was awarded a Master of Public Health from the Nordic College for Public Health in Gothenburg, Sweden. The subject of her Master's thesis was Group treatment of women with chronic pelvic pain. In 2004, she was awarded a Ph.D. degree from the Faculty of Health Sciences, University of Southern Denmark, based on her thesis entitled Non-surgical treatment of patients with sciatica. A randomized clinical controlled trial.

Albert started her career as a physiotherapist at Odense University Hospital, where she later became a clinical lecturer. In 2000, she was employed as a researcher in the research department at The Back Centre in Ringe, Denmark. She held the title of Associate Professor at the Faculty of Health Sciences, University of Southern Denmark starting in 2010. She left the university in 2013 and became the Medical Director at the Modic Clinic, Odense, Denmark.

Research and publications
Albert's research career began in the field of gynaecology and obstetrics at the gynaecology ward of Odense University Hospital where she worked with women experiencing chronic pelvic pain. Together with another physiotherapist, Tove Boe, she developed a new treatment for women with chronic pelvic pain using a psychosomatic approach. Combining qualitative actions research methods with quantitative measurements of improvement. The results showed that the patients improved significantly. This research was published in her Master's thesis and as a scientific paper.

The high number of pregnant women with pelvic girdle pain presented a challenge for the obstetric department. Little was known about the diagnosis and treatment of this painful condition in pregnant and post-partum women. Together with another physiotherapist, Mona Godskesen, Albert attempted to classify the different groups of pelvic girdle pain into subgroups which required different treatment. The study (still the largest in the world) included 2269 pregnant women, all of whom were examined in the twentieth week of their pregnancy. The women who suffered from pelvic pain were followed at 1, 3, 6, 12, 24 months post-partum, or until their pelvic pain subsided. The study found that there are most likely four different subgroups of pelvic girdle pain. Then different groups have different incidence, and there is different clinical characteristics, pain pattern, and prognosis. Most important is the subgroup Pelvic Girdle Syndrome, with 5% of the pregnant women suffering from it. Unfortunately, these women have a poor prognosis, hence 20% of the women still suffer from pain 2 years after delivery of the child. This research resulted in five scientific papers and three summaries. For this scientific work she was awarded two awards, and a seat in the European Guideline Group.

Disc herniation
In 2000 Albert was employed as a researcher and a Ph.D. student at The Back Centre in Ringe. The aim of her Ph.D. was to evaluate the possibility of treating patients with severe lumbar disc herniation via exercises. Normally, such patients would have been offered surgical intervention for treatment. The PhD study demonstrated that there was significant improvement in patients of this kind of treatment. The PhD also demonstrated that different symptoms would react to different treatments, i.e., specific exercises and positioning, different personality traits, and different types of herniation, and these subgroups required different treatment.

Modic changes
The Ph.D. study revealed one previously unknown fact. About 50% of the patients developed Modic changes in the vertebrae adjacent to the one previously herniated - this was visible one year after their disc herniation. These patients also developed back pain, whereas the main problem that they presented while having the lumbar disc herniation was pain radiating into one or both legs. Hanne Albert was the first to describe this connection between a previous herniation and new Modic changes in the adjacent vertebra. This was unknown news and in 2007, led her, together with radiologist Joan Solgård Sørensen, to publish, their ideas of three theories of the pathogenesis behind Modic changes; a bacterial cause, a mechanical cause and a rheumatological cause.

Bacteria as a cause of back pain
The new idea presented was that through a lesion in the herniated disc, the bacteria Propioni Acnes could invade the disc, and that Modic changes/bone edema was the edema surrounding the infected disc. Antibiotic treatment was a relevant treatment for an infection. The first study of antibiotic treatment of Modic changes was published in 2008. Here 32 patients in a pilot study were treated with long-term antibiotics and 60% of this cohort showed significant improvement or had their back pain cured. In 2013, the first randomized clinically controlled trial was published. This study had a cohort of 162 patients. As with the earlier pilot study, there was a significant and clinically relevant improvement in the patients that received the antibiotic treatment and no change in the patients that received placebo tablets. The results created international interest. Previous opinion had been that back pain was either caused by mechanical problems in the tissue or the pain was psychosomatic. Now there was a third cause, that back pain could be caused by bacterial infection. 

Modic changes/bone edema is a very painful disease, and Hanne Albert has led or she has been a part of several teams which have explored this painful condition.

Publications
Albert has been the head author or co-author of 55 scientific papers that were published in peer-reviewed papers.
She has been the co-author of three books. She was also an assistant editor of the European Spine Journal.

Honours, awards and distinctions
2003: Danish Physiotherapists Research Award for; original and innovative research with immediate clinical relevance. 
2004: “The Columna price” from The Danish Society for Musculoskeletal Medicine. For comprehensive clinical research in women with pelvic pain related to pregnancy and after delivery, and the extensive educational to implement this new knowledge in all groups of health professionals.
2005: “Modic changes following lumbar disc herniation”. The best scientific presentation at the European Spine conference in Barcelona. 
2017: “The German Pain prize” for showing there was a third new cause of back pain due to a by bacterial infection, instead of the early belief, that back pain was either caused by mechanical problems in the tissue or the back pain was psychosomatic.

The scientific work that Albert did within diagnostic of Pelvic Girdle pain resulted in an invitation to be a part of the group that wrote the European guidelines for diagnostic and treatment of pelvic girdle pain, which was published in 2008.

References

Living people
Year of birth missing (living people)
Women medical researchers
Danish medical researchers

University of Southern Denmark alumni
Physiotherapists